Ente Kalithozhan is a 1984 Indian Malayalam-language film, directed and produced by M. Mani. The film stars Shankar, Sabitha Anand, Adoor Bhasi, Sukumari and K. P. Ummer. The film has musical score by Shyam.

Plot
Ente Kalithozhan is a romantic film.

Cast
Shankar
Sabitha Anand
Ramu
Sukumari
Adoor Bhasi
K. P. Ummer
Sathyakala

Soundtrack

The music was composed by Shyam and the lyrics were written by Chunakkara Ramankutty.

References

External links
 

1984 films
1980s Malayalam-language films
Films directed by M. Mani